Maren Kawehilani Jensen (born September 23, 1956) is an American former model and actress, best known for portraying Lieutenant Athena in the 1978–79 television series Battlestar Galactica. Jensen also made guest appearances in several US television series, such as The Love Boat and Fantasy Island.

Biography
Maren Jensen was born in Arcadia, California, a native Hawaiian. Her father was a physician, and her mother was a secretary with the Los Angeles Zoo. She is a middle child, with an older brother, Dana, and a younger sister, Kathleen. Jensen attended Herbert Hoover High School from 1971 to 1974, and after graduating received a scholarship to attend UCLA, where she majored in Theater Arts and Law.

While still in college, Jensen began a modeling career. She was featured on the covers of Vogue and Mademoiselle. A mutual friend introduced her to the agent Barbara Gale, who helped arrange two network commercials and a role in The Hardy Boys/Nancy Drew Mysteries in 1977. In 1978, Jensen starred in Battlestar Galactica in the role of Athena. She was featured on the cover of TV Guide in April 1979. Her last known role was in Wes Craven's 1981 horror film Deadly Blessing alongside Sharon Stone. Her career was cut short by illness, after she contracted Epstein-Barr Syndrome. In 1993 Maren co-founded Stila Cosmetics which became one of the best selling makeup brands in retailers like Sephora. 

Jensen was a longtime companion of singer-songwriter Don Henley. In 1982, Henley released his first solo album, I Can't Stand Still, and dedicated it to her. She is credited for "Harmony Vocals" on the song "Johnny Can't Read," and is credited in the liner notes for having composed the piano intro and interlude on the song "A Month of Sundays" on Henley's 1984 album Building the Perfect Beast. She appeared in the video for Henley's song "Not Enough Love In the World" in 1985. Henley and Jensen were engaged, but they separated in 1986. Jensen helped Henley establish The Walden Woods Project in the early 1990s, an organization dedicated to protecting the Walden Woods area in Concord, Massachusetts from development.

Jensen was also reported to be married to John Kugelberg but they were also reported to be separated. They have kept everything about their relationship very private and out of the public eye, including their marriage and separation date. Neither has shared any photos together. She has been reported as living in the New York metro area and has been returning to the Los Angeles metro area from time to time because of business, family, and friends.

Filmography

References

External links
 
  Jensen on Super-Hair.net "Ultimate 50"
 
 

American television actresses
1956 births
Living people
People with chronic fatigue syndrome
People from Arcadia, California
Actresses from California
Female models from California
UCLA Film School alumni
Native Hawaiian actresses
20th-century American actresses
21st-century American women